The BMW N73 is a naturally aspirated V12 petrol engine which replaced the BMW M73 and was produced from 2003–2016. It was used in the BMW 7 Series and Rolls-Royce Phantom.

The N73 was the world's first production V12 engine to use gasoline direct injection.

Compared with its M73 predecessor, the N73 has dual overhead camshafts, double-VANOS (variable valve timing) and valvetronic (variable valve lift).

Design 
The variable valve timing (VANOS) is a continuously variable design and is present on both the intake and exhaust camshafts. The VANOS units were designed as integral components of the chain drive, and the adjustment ranges are 63 degrees for the intake camshaft and 60 degrees for the exhaust camshaft. The redline for the N73 is 6,500 rpm.

Each cylinder head has a valvetronic assembly – including a motor, control module and position sensor.

The N73 was superseded by the BMW N74, a twin-turbocharged V12 engine.

Versions

N73B60 

Application:
 2003-2008 E65/E66 760i/760Li
 2017-present Eadon Green Black Cuillin

N73B68 

Application:
 2003-2016 Rolls-Royce Phantom

See also
 List of BMW engines

References

N73
V12 engines
Gasoline engines by model